Syria–United Arab Emirates relations refer to the relationship between the United Arab Emirates (UAE) and the Syrian Arab Republic. The UAE has an embassy in Damascus, and Syria has an embassy in Abu Dhabi and a consulate-general in Dubai. Both countries are members of the Arab League (Syria was temporarily suspended in 2012), part of the Middle East region and share close cultural ties.

Diplomatic relations

Emirati reaction to and intervention in Syrian civil war
In 2011, the Syrian civil war began. On 25 September 2013, Foreign minister Abdullah bin Zayed Al Nahyan said that the UAE would continue to support the Syrian people and their legitimate aspirations for restoring security and stability to the country. The UAE is not actively supporting the government of Bashar Al-Assad. On 13 January 2014, Vice President, Prime Minister and Emir of Dubai Shaikh Mohammed bin Rashid Al Maktoum said that there could be no long-term solution to ending the war with Assad in power, and predicted that the Syrian president would eventually lose power.

The UAE stance on the Syrian conflict has been described as "less aggressive" than Saudi Arabia or Qatar—but, unlike Egypt, not "favourable to Assad". However, it has exhibited openness to Assad remaining in power as part of a peace settlement. It has been critical of Saudi, Qatari and Turkish support for Islamist rebel groups in Syria.

The UAE took part in the 2014 American-led intervention in Syria against ISIL. It later broke with Saudi Arabia by supporting the 2015 Russian military intervention in the Syrian Civil War, maintaining it was against a "common enemy". It also reportedly provided funding for the moderate Southern Front, through an Amman-based Military Operations Center, although this center has been inactive since 2017. Alongside the United States, it has been involved in supporting and training the Kurdish-dominated Syrian Democratic Forces (SDF) from 2017 onwards. Along with Egypt and Russia, it also supports the Syria's Tomorrow Movement, which has a military wing, the Elite Forces, that is part of the SDF.

Warming relations
The UAE initially floated normalising relations with Syria in 2016 in order to reduce Syrian dependence on Iran, but the suggestion was rejected by the United States.

In April 2018, Emirati Foreign Minister Anwar Gargash stated, "Our position on the Syrian crisis is very clear: a few years ago we had a choice—to support Bashar Assad or the opposition, which was joined by jihadists and even many terrorist elements, and we chose to be somewhere between. We confirm the need for a political solution in Syria. It is impossible to achieve stability in this country through a military solution."

In June 2018, Gargash criticised the decision to suspend Syrian membership of the Arab League, noting, "it meant we had no political leverage at all, no open channel, we could not present an Arab prism to how the Syrian issue should be resolved."

In November 2018, it was reported that the United Arab Emirates was negotiating with Syria over the reopening of its embassy in Damascus, already had a diplomat permanently stationed there, and was acting as an intermediary between Syria and Saudi Arabia in reconciliation talks involving those two countries. On 27 December 2018, the United Arab Emirates announced it had reopened its embassy in Damascus, after over 6 years of closure. The UAE issued a statement that said the country was "keen to put relations back on their normal track", while Gargash tweeted that "An Arab role in Syria has become even more necessary to face the regional expansionism of Iran and Turkey."

In early January 2019, following the embassy opening, Emirates, FlyDubai and Etihad announced plans to fly to Syria again, but no announcement has been made regarding when flights will restart. In an attempt to restore ties with the Syrian government, the UAE hosted a Syrian trade delegation in January 2019. The meeting was led by a businessman and lawmaker who has been on US Treasury sanctions list since 2011.

On 29 January 2019, the UAE Minister of State of Foreign Affairs said regarding the Israeli strikes on Syria that the UAE supported Syria and a united capable Arab Syria. However, he also said that the UAE was against the Iranians' presence in Syria and that the dispute is caused by the freedom of movement Iran has in Syria.

In December 2019, the UAE's charges d'affairs in Damascus, Abdul Hakim Ibrahim al-Nuaimi, praised the "wise leadership of President Bashar al-Assad" and described relations between the countries as "solid, distinct and strong". Syrian deputy foreign minister Faisal Mekdad responded by stating, "We cannot forget that the United Arab Emirates stood by Syria in its war against terrorism".

On 27 March 2020, Abu Dhabi crown prince Mohammed bin Zayed Al Nahyan and Syrian President Bashar al-Assad discussed the COVID-19 pandemic on phone.

In April 2020, it was reported that the UAE had promised Assad money to break a ceasefire with the Turkish-backed rebels and restart the Idlib offensive in order to tie up Turkish resources, but the proposal was blocked due to Russian objections.

On 9 November 2021, United Arab Emirates Foreign Minister Abdullah bin Zayed Al Nahyan met with Syrian President Bashar al-Assad, for the first time since the outbreak of the Syrian Civil War in 2011, to discuss "ways to develop cooperation in different sectors that are of common interest".

In March 2022, Al-Assad visited the United Arab Emirates, which was his first visit to an Arab country since the 2011 Syrian civil war. He met Mohammed bin Zayed al-Nahyan, Mohammed Al Maktoum and Mansour Bin Zayed Al Nahyan.  According to Emirati state media, Mohammed bin Zayed al-Nahyan ""stressed that Syria is a fundamental pillar of Arab security, and that the UAE is keen to strengthen cooperation with it".

In January 2023, the UAE joined Russia in promoting reconciliation in Syria-Turkey relations, following the restoration of Turkey–United Arab Emirates relations in 2022.

In March 2023, Syrian President Bashar al-Assad conducted a state visit to the UAE where he was received with full honours in Abu Dhabi by Sheikh Mohamed bin Zayed al-Nahyan.

References

 
Bilateral relations of the United Arab Emirates
United Arab Emirates